Stanford Intelligent Systems Laboratory (SISL) is a research laboratory at Stanford University. It operates within the Stanford Department of Aeronautics & Astronautics.

Drone research

SISL has worked with Suave to build drones and other flying aircraft. The laboratory has done research under the direction of Mykel Kochenderfer to develop autonomous anti-collision methods for drones since it is assumed that eventually, their numbers will be too large to rely on the type of air traffic control that is used for airplanes. With over one hundred other organizations that are working on this NASA project, SISL is providing input into the development of this technology. The goal of the NASA project is to have a system in place for 2019. Based on a paper by Mykel Kochenderfer and Hao Yi Ong, the SISL team is working on software that allows drones to make very fast (millisecond) decisions when flying in crowded spaces such as urban areas.  If successful, this technology may benefit large commercial interests who would like to use drones for delivery of packages from their online stores.

Funding

SISL is supported by numerous external sponsors, including Federal Aviation Administration (FAA), MIT Lincoln Laboratory, NASA, National Science Foundation, Bosch, and SAP.

External links
 SISL Home Page

See also
Stanford Artificial Intelligence Laboratory

References

Stanford University
Aeronautical navigation systems